Gerhard Menzel (29 September 1894 – 4 May 1966) was a German screenwriter. He wrote for nearly 40 films between 1933 and 1965. He was supportive of Nazism and worked for Nazi propaganda. He was responsible for writing the script of Heimkehr, one of the most infamous pieces of Nazi cinema, which featured racism and hateful images of Poles.

He was born in Waldenburg, Lower Silesia, Germany (now Walbrzych, Poland) and died in Comano, Ticino, Switzerland.

Selected filmography

 Morgenrot (1933)
 Refugees (1933)
 Night in May (1934)
 The Young Baron Neuhaus (1934)
 Savoy Hotel 217 (1936)
 Under Blazing Heavens (1936)
 Wells in Flames (1937)
 La Habanera (1937)
 Woman in the River (1939)
 A Mother's Love (1939)
 Robert Koch (1939)
 Heimkehr (1941)
 The Great King (1942)
 Destiny (1942)
 Late Love (1943)
 The Heart Must Be Silent (1944)
 The Sinner (1951)
 Hanussen (1955)
 Ich suche Dich (1956)
 King in Shadow (1957)

References

External links

1894 births
1966 deaths
German male screenwriters
Kleist Prize winners
People from the Province of Silesia
People from Wałbrzych
German male writers
Nazi propagandists
20th-century German screenwriters